Socialism with a Northern Accent: Radical Traditions for Modern Times is a book by Paul Salveson, at that time a Labour Party and trade union activist, which re-asserts the strength and distinctiveness of the socialism which emerged in the mills, mines and railway yards of the North of England. It also makes the case for the renewal of popular socialism through devolution to the North of England.

The book was originally published with a foreword by John Prescott, who described it as "an important account of Labour’s traditional, community-based values with many lessons for today".

References 

2011 non-fiction books
Books about socialism
Lawrence & Wishart books